Lewis Fueter (1746–1784), born Ludwig Anton Fueter, was an American silversmith, active in New York City.

Feuter's father was silversmith Daniel Christian Fueter, and he was born in Bern, Switzerland, before the family emigrated. They arrived in New York City circa 1754, where his father established a shop. It seems likely that he worked in his father's shop for some interval, then entered into partnership with his father as evidenced by the following advertisement:

When his father returned to Switzerland in 1769, along with the younger son, Christian Fueter, Lewis remained in New York with his brother Daniel Fueter, Jr. He established his own shop, as indicated by the following advertisement:

Fueter was made freeman on March 28, 1775. A few months later, on August 12, 1775, he was attacked by a mob of American revolutionaries for his Loyalist inclinations. As recorded in a letter written from Staten Island by an unknown Tory: "The persecution of the loyalists continues unremitted. Donald McLean, Theophilus Hardenbrook, young Fueter, the silversmith, and Rem Rapelje of Brooklyn, have been cruelly rode on rails, a practice most painful, dangerous and, till now, peculiar to the humane population of New England."  By about 1778, Feuter was commissioned to make sword belt plates for the Royal Provincial Corps. When the British evacuated New York in 1783, Fueter accompanied them to Halifax. Shortly thereafter he went to Jamaica, where he drowned in 1784.

Fueter's work is collected in the Metropolitan Museum of Art, Clark Art Institute, and Winterthur Museum.

References 
 "Lewis Fueter", New York Historical Society.
 "Some Royal Provincial Belt Plates and the Revolutionary War: Vanguard of British Neo-classicism in America?", by Gary Hughes, in Material Culture Review 73 (Spring 2011).
 New York newspaper advertisements and news items: 1777-1779, University of Oxford Text Archive.
 American silver at Winterthur, Ian M. G. Quimby, Dianne Johnson, Henry Francis du Pont Winterthur Museum, 1995, page 230.

External links 
 

American silversmiths
1746 births
1784 deaths
People from Bern
Swiss expatriates in the United States